Sharon Margaret Crosbie  (born 1945) is a former broadcaster and broadcasting executive from New Zealand. She served as the chief executive of Radio New Zealand from 1995 to 2004.

Life
Born in Rangiora in 1945, Crosbie studied at Victoria University of Wellington. She joined the New Zealand Broadcasting Corporation in 1969 and worked in a variety of roles in television and radio, including as host of the morning segment on the National Programme between 1978 and 1984.  Crosbie was appointed chief executive of Radio New Zealand in 1995, and remained in that position until 2004.

In 1984, Crosbie was awarded a Harkness Fellowship and a Neiman Fellowship in journalism at Harvard University. She has been chairperson of the New Zealand Drama School, a 1990 Commissioner, a member of the New Zealand–Japan Foundation, a member of the Women’s Refuge Foundation Trust Board and was chairperson of the Ministerial Advisory Committee on Core Health Services. She is chair of the Electra Trust, an electricity distribution trust based in Levin.

In 1992, she considered running as a candidate for Mayor of Wellington at that year's local-body election.

Honours and awards
In the 1989 New Year Honours, Crosbie was appointed an Officer of the Order of the British Empire, for services to broadcasting. The following year, she was awarded the New Zealand 1990 Commemoration Medal. In the 2004 Queen's Birthday Honours, she was made a Companion of the New Zealand Order of Merit, for services to broadcasting and the community.

References

1945 births
Living people
People from Rangiora
Victoria University of Wellington alumni
New Zealand broadcasters
Radio executives
New Zealand chief executives
New Zealand women chief executives
Companions of the New Zealand Order of Merit
New Zealand Officers of the Order of the British Empire